The North Star 80/20 is a Canadian sailboat that was designed by Sparkman & Stephens as a cruiser and first built in 1973. The boat is a version of Sparkman & Stephens' design 2134.

A heavier version of the design was sold as the Hughes 40. Sparkman & Stephens design 2134 was also the basis for the Swift 40 built by Kang Nam Shipbuilders in South Korea.

Production
The design was built by North Star Yachts in Canada, starting in 1973 and later by Hughes Boat Works, also in Canada, after Howard Hughes bought the company back and renamed both the company and the sailboat models sold.

Design
The North Star 80/20 is a recreational keelboat, built predominantly of fibreglass, with wood trim. It has a masthead ketch rig, a centre cockpit, a raked stem, an angled transom, a skeg-mounted rudder controlled by a wheel and a fixed fin keel.

The design has sleeping accommodation for seven people, with a double "V"-berth in the bow cabin, three straight settee berths in the main cabin and an aft cabin with a double "V"-berth. The galley is located on the port side just forward of the companionway ladder. The galley is "U"-shaped and is equipped with a three-burner stove and a sink. There are two heads, one just aft of the bow cabin on the starboard side and one on the starboard side in the aft cabin.

For sailing the design may be equipped with one of a number of jibs or genoas.

Variants
North Star 80/20
This model built by North Star Yachts displaces  and carries  of ballast.
Hughes 40
This model built by Hughes Boat Works displaces  and carries  of ballast.

Operational history
When new, some North Star 80/20s were employed in the Caribbean yacht charter market.

See also
List of sailing boat types

Related boats
Swift 40

References

Keelboats
1970s sailboat type designs
Sailing yachts
Sailboat type designs by Sparkman and Stephens
Sailboat types built by Hughes Boat Works